Athamanes may refer to:

Athamanes, Karditsa, a municipal unit in Karditsa regional unit, Greece
Athamanians, an ancient tribe